Phillips Chapel CME Church (also known as Lincoln High School) is a historic Christian Methodist Episcopal church building at 638 N. Tornillo Street in Las Cruces, New Mexico. It was built in 1912 and added to the National Register of Historic Places in 2003.
 
It was described in its National Register nomination as "representative of vernacular church architecture showing a modest influence of local Spanish/Hispano architectural traditions."

It underwent an extensive restoration project starting around 2010 and ending in 2016.

See also

National Register of Historic Places listings in Doña Ana County, New Mexico

References

External links

Methodist churches in New Mexico
Churches on the National Register of Historic Places in New Mexico
Churches completed in 1912
1912 establishments in New Mexico
National Register of Historic Places in Doña Ana County, New Mexico
Chapels in the United States
Buildings and structures in Las Cruces, New Mexico
Churches in Doña Ana County, New Mexico